Asterropteryx is a genus of fish in the family Gobiidae found in the Indian and Pacific Ocean.

Species
There are currently 9 recognized species in this genus:
 Asterropteryx atripes Shibukawa & T. Suzuki, 2002 (Yano's starrygoby)
 Asterropteryx bipunctata G. R. Allen & Munday, 1995 (Orange-spotted starrygoby)
 Asterropteryx ensifera (Bleeker, 1874) (Miller's starrygoby) 
 Asterropteryx ovata Shibukawa & T. Suzuki, 2007 (Oval-spot starrygoby)
 Asterropteryx profunda G. R. Allen & Erdmann, 2016 
 Asterropteryx semipunctata Rüppell, 1830 (Starry goby)
 Asterropteryx senoui Shibukawa & T. Suzuki, 2007 (Senou's starrygoby)
 Asterropteryx spinosa (Goren, 1981) (Eye-bar starrygoby) 
 Asterropteryx striata G. R. Allen & Munday, 1995

References

 
Gobiidae
Marine fish genera
Taxa named by Eduard Rüppell